Bump Nonprofit Design Studio (Bump) is a not for profit organization based in Champaign, Illinois that created the OpenSocket prosthetic arm.

History

Founded as a student group (Illinois Prosthetics Team) at the University of Illinois in 2008, the group registered as a not for profit organization named Illini Prosthetics Technologies in 2009 and gained 501(c)(3) status in 2010. In 2012, the organization changed the name to Bump Nonprofit Design Studio.

The OpenSocket

The OpenSocket prosthetic arm was designed by Bump and is a transradial body-powered prosthetic device with an adjustable socket. The OpenSocket is made up of a flexible plastic core enclosed in fabric. This flexible plastic core consists of two layers of low density polyethelene plastic that allows the device to change size and shape in order to fit different users with the same socket. The OpenSocket uses a standard harness and cable system to provide control over opening and closing the terminal device.

References

Prosthetic manufacturers
Organizations based in Chicago
Health charities in the United States
Medical and health organizations based in Illinois